Attavyros is a former municipality on the island of Rhodes, in the Dodecanese, Greece. Since the 2011 local government reform it is part of the municipality Rhodes, of which it is a municipal unit.

Geography
The population is 2,433 (2011 census); the land area is 234.350 km². It is the westernmost municipal unit on the island, occupying the central portion of its western coast. The seat of the municipality was in Emponas (pop. 1,061). Its largest other towns are Ágios Isídoros (355) and Kritinia (454). In land area it is the second-largest municipal unit on Rhodes and the second-least densely populated, after South Rhodes (Notia Rodos).

The municipal unit is composed by five communities:

Gallery

References

External links

Populated places in Rhodes